Wuzhong District is one of five urban districts of Suzhou, Jiangsu Province, China.

Administrative divisions
In the present, Wuzhong District has 8 subdistricts and 7 towns.
8 subdistricts

7 towns

See also
 Wu County

References

External links
 Official website of Wuzhong District 

 
Administrative divisions of Suzhou
County-level divisions of Jiangsu